The Marvelous Land of Oz: Being an Account of the Further Adventures of the Scarecrow and the Tin Woodman, commonly shortened to The Land of Oz, published in July 1904, is the second of L. Frank Baum's books set in the Land of Oz, and the sequel to The Wonderful Wizard of Oz (1900). This and the next 34 Oz books of the famous 40 were illustrated by John R. Neill. The book was made into an episode of The Shirley Temple Show in 1960, and into a Canada/Japan co-produced animated series of the same name in 1986. It was also adapted in comic book form by Marvel Comics; once in 1975 in the Marvel Treasury of Oz series, and again in an eight issue series with the first issue being released in November 2009. Plot elements from The Marvelous Land of Oz are included in the 1985 Disney feature film Return to Oz.

Plot summary
The events are set shortly after the events in The Wonderful Wizard of Oz and after Dorothy Gale's departure back to Kansas. The protagonist of the novel is an orphan boy called Tip. For as long as he can remember, Tip has been under the guardianship of a cruel Wicked Witch named Mombi and lives in the northern quadrant of Oz called Gillikin Country. Mombi has always been extremely mean and abusive to Tip. As Mombi is returning home one day, Tip plans to get revenge and frighten her with a wooden man he has made, with a large Jack-o'-lantern he carves for a head, thus naming him Jack Pumpkinhead. To Tip's dismay, Mombi is not fooled by this trick, and she takes this opportunity to demonstrate the new magical "Powder of Life" that she had just obtained from another sorcerer. Mombi tells Tip that she intends to transform him into a marble statue to punish him for his mischievous ways.

To avoid being turned into a marble statue, Tip runs away with Jack that very same night and steals the Powder of Life.  He uses it to animate the wooden Sawhorse for Jack to ride. The Sawhorse runs so quickly that Tip is left behind. Walking alone, he meets General Jinjur's all-girl Army of Revolt, which is planning to overthrow the Scarecrow (who has ruled the Emerald City since the end of The Wonderful Wizard of Oz). Meanwhile, Jack and the Sawhorse arrive at the Emerald City and make the acquaintance of His Majesty the Scarecrow. Jinjur and her crew invade the Emerald City, terrorize the citizens, and loot the city, causing great havoc and chaos. Tip joins Jack and the Scarecrow in the palace, and they escape on the Sawhorse's back.

The companions arrive at the tin castle of the Tin Woodman (who now rules the Winkie Kingdom following the Wicked Witch of the West's demise in the first book) and plan to retake the Emerald City with his help. On their way back, they are diverted by the magic of Mombi (whom Jinjur recruited to help her apprehend them). They are joined by the "Highly Magnified and Thoroughly Educated" Woggle-Bug, and aided by the loyal field mice and their Mouse Queen. The Queen of the field mice allows the Scarecrow to take twelve mice concealed in his straw.  When the party reaches the Emerald City, Jinjur and her soldiers imprison the group and lock them away. However, the female soldiers are scared by the field mice and leave the city's palace. However, they still occupy the grounds of the city, and the palace is surrounded. The travelers are imprisoned in the palace. The Scarecrow proposes manufacturing a clever flying machine with a Gump's stuffed head to direct it. Tip uses the powder of life to animate this machine, which is assembled from the palace furniture, and they fly off, with no control over their direction, out of Oz. They land in a nest of jackdaws, which is full of all of the birds' stolen goods. The flying Gump's wings are damaged in the landing.

The jackdaws return to their nest and attack the travelers, carrying off the Scarecrow's straw. The nest contains a large amount of paper money, with which the Scarecrow can be re-stuffed. Using Wishing Pills they discover in the container holding the Powder of Life, Tip and his friends escape and journey to the palace of Glinda the Good Witch in Oz's southern quadrant, the Quadling Country. They learn from Glinda that after the fall of Oz's mortal king Pastoria decades ago, a long lost princess named Ozma was hidden away in secrecy when the Wizard of Oz took the throne. She also informs them that Ozma is the rightful ruler of the Emerald City and all of Oz in general, not the Scarecrow (who did not really want the job anyway). Glinda therefore accompanies Tip, Jack, the Sawhorse, the Scarecrow, the Tin Woodman, the Wogglebug, and the Gump back to the Emerald City to see Mombi. The crooked woman tries to deceive them by disguising a chambermaid named Jellia Jamb as herself (which fails), but manages to elude them as they search for her in the Emerald City. Just as their time runs out, the Tin Woodman plucks a rose to wear in his lapel, unaware that this is the transformed Mombi.

Glinda discovers the deception right away and leads the pursuit of Mombi, who is finally caught as she tries to cross the Deadly Desert in the form of a fast and long-running griffin. Under pressure from Glinda, Mombi confesses that the Wizard brought her the infant Ozma, whom she transformed into ... the boy Tip. At first, Tip is utterly shocked and appalled to learn this, but Glinda and his friends help him to accept his duty, and Mombi performs her last spell to undo the curse, turning him back into the fairy princess Ozma.

The restored Ozma is established on the throne after defeating Jinjur and her army. The Tin Woodman invites the Scarecrow to return with him to the Winkie Country along with Jack Pumpkinhead. The Gump is disassembled at his request (though his head was a hunting trophy that can still speak), Glinda returns to her palace in Quadling Country, the Wogglebug remains as Ozma's advisor, and the Sawhorse becomes Ozma's personal steed. The forgotten prophecy is finally fulfilled and Oz is politically whole once more, with Ozma in her rightful position as the child Queen of Oz.

Dramatic adaptations

Stage
The Wonderful Wizard of Oz had been transformed into a stage play, and several elements of the sequel book were clearly incorporated with an eye to it also being adapted for the stage. The Marvelous Land of Oz was dedicated to David C. Montgomery and Fred Stone, the comedians "whose clever personations of the Tin Woodman and the Scarecrow have delighted thousands of children throughout the land..." in the 1902 stage adaptation of the first Oz book. Following the Tin Woodman's and the Scarecrow's importance to the play, a similar importance is given them this work, where neither Dorothy nor the Cowardly Lion appear.

The Marvelous Land of Oz was also influenced by the story and vaudevillian tone of the stage play. The character of the Wizard was in the book a good man though a bad wizard but in the play, the villain of the piece; this is reflected by the evil part he is described as having played in the back story of this work. The two armies of women, both Jinjur's and Glinda's, were so clearly intended as future chorus girls that even reviews of the book noted the similarity.

It has been suggested that the twist of Tip being the Princess Ozma also reflects stage traditions, as Tip would have likely have been played by a woman in drag.

One early reviewer of The Marvelous Land of Oz noted that some details in the book clearly appeared to be designed for stage production—in particular, "General Jinjur and her soldiers are only shapely chorus girls." Since the stage adaptation of The Wonderful Wizard of Oz had been a huge hit, with two companies still touring the country as the second book was published, the reviewer's suspicion was both natural and accurate.

Baum wrote a stage adaptation called The Woggle-Bug that was produced in Chicago the summer of 1905. (The detail of Tip/Ozma's sex change, which can raise a range of psychological speculations in modern readers, made perfect sense in terms of early twentieth-century stage practice, since the juvenile male role of Tip would have been played by an actress as a matter of course.) The musical score was composed by Frederic Chapin, and Fred Mace played the Woggle-Bug. (Baum had wanted Fred Stone and David Montgomery to reprise their roles as the Scarecrow and Tin Woodman for the second show, but the two refused, fearing typecasting, and the characters were omitted completely from the play.) The play was not successful and has not been published, though it has been preserved on microfilm. Its songs were published, and a collected volume was published by Hungry Tiger Press in 2001. The play script was out of print for a while, but is now available again.

A new stage production of The Marvelous Land of Oz was mounted in Minneapolis in 1981, with music composed by Richard Dworsky, a book by Thomas W. Olson, and lyrics by Gary Briggle, who originated the role of the Scarecrow. This play stayed close to the novel, eliminating some stage-difficult moments and expanding the role of Jellia Jamb. The play was premiered by The Children's Theatre Company and School of Minneapolis, and a recording of the production was made available by MCA Video. The professional and community theatre rights to the play are currently available.

Film
In addition to being part of the basis for Baum's The Fairylogue and Radio-Plays, Land of Oz was the final 1910 Selig Polyscope Oz film, and has been brought to the screen several additional times. 

The Land of Oz, a Sequel to the Wizard of Oz was a two-reel production by the Meglin Kiddies made in 1931 and released in 1932. The film was recently recovered, but the soundtrack of the second reel is missing. 

The Wonderful Land of Oz (1969) was a studio-bound production from independent filmmaker Barry Mahon, which starred his son, Channy, as Tip. Mahon had previously produced nudie films; however, those films were made in New York, while Oz was made in Florida, and neither Caroline Berner (as General Jinjur) nor the rest of her army were drawn from his former casts. 

Filmation's Journey Back to Oz (1971), recast the army of revolt with green elephants and Tip with Dorothy (voiced by Judy Garland's daughter Liza Minnelli, but was essentially an unaccredited adaptation of this book. 

Elements from this novel and the following one, Ozma of Oz, were incorporated into the 1985 film Return to Oz featuring Fairuza Balk as Dorothy.

The Land of Oz was also adapted as two episodes of Russian animated series Adventures of the Emerald City: The intrigues of old Mombi (2000) and Princess Ozma (2000).

Unproduced film script
The Wizard of Oz screenwriter Noel Langley registered an unproduced script with the U.S. Copyright Office which framed the story as the dream of an orphaned girl named "Tippie".

Television
The story was dramatized on the TV series The Shirley Temple Show in a one-hour program, The Land of Oz, broadcast on September 18, 1960, with a notable cast including Shirley Temple as Tip and Ozma, Agnes Moorehead as Mombi the witch, Sterling Holloway as Jack Pumpkinhead, Ben Blue as the Scarecrow, Gil Lamb as the Tin Woodman, and Mel Blanc as the voice of the Saw-Horse. Although the adaptation was faithful overall, much of the plot had to be sacrificed to fit the story into a one-hour time slot, and Dr. Nikidik was added to the storyline and refashioned into a lord (played by Jonathan Winters).

The Marvelous Land of Oz was the first of five television productions of The Children's Theatre Company of Minneapolis in 1981.  The musical has a book by Thomas W. Olson,  lyrics by Gary Briggle (who also played the Scarecrow in the original production), and music by Richard A. Dworsky.  MCA Videocasette Inc. released all five on VHS between 1982 and 1986.

The novel was adapted in Ozu no Mahōtsukai. Elements of the 2007 Sci Fi miniseries Tin Man also borrow from this book as much as it did The Wonderful Wizard of Oz. The protagonist, like Tip/Ozma, was a lost princess sent away from The O.Z. and magically altered to forget much of her previous existence.

The 1983 stop-motion cartoon W krainie czarnoksiężnika Oza (In the Land of the Wizard of Oz) combined the adaptation of The Wonderful Wizard of Oz and The Marvelous Land of Oz in 13 episodes.

Game
In 1985, the Windham Classics text adventure game The Wizard of Oz adapted much of the plot of this book, however it did not include the bespelled Ozma. At the story's conclusion Tip is crowned King of Oz.

Later novel
Gregory Maguire's novel Out of Oz (fourth and final volume of The Wicked Years) incorporates many plot elements of The Marvelous Land of Oz.

References
Footnotes

Bibliography

External links

 
 
 
Free PDF of The Marvelous Land of Oz from The Internet Archive
 

Oz (franchise) books
1904 American novels
1904 fantasy novels
Sequel novels
Fiction about shapeshifting
American fantasy novels adapted into films
1904 children's books
Novels with transgender themes
Novels adapted into comics
American novels adapted into television shows